Wieland: or, The Transformation: An American Tale, usually simply called Wieland, is the first major work by Charles Brockden Brown. First published in 1798, it distinguishes the true beginning of his career as a writer. Wieland is sometimes considered the first American Gothic novel. It has often been linked to Caleb Williams by William Godwin. Godwin's influence is clear, but Brown's writing is unique in its style. Wieland is often categorized under several subgenres other than gothic fiction, including horror, psychological fiction and epistolary fiction, which are listed at Project Gutenberg.

Main characters
Clara Wieland is the narrator of the story, and the sister of Theodore Wieland. She is an intellectual, and has strong character. She is secretly in love with Henry Pleyel.
Theodore Wieland hears voices of dead people, and believes these voices tell him to kill his family. He is not as strong as his sister, Clara, which makes him fall prey to the voices and go insane.
Catharine Wieland (née Pleyel) is Theodore's wife, and childhood friend of Clara.
Henry Pleyel is Catharine's brother, and Clara's friend. He is extremely practical and continually attempts to understand the mysterious voices empirically.
Carwin is a mysterious stranger who appears at the Wielands' house. He is a biloquist – able to speak in two different voices – and the source of many of the disembodied voices heard by Theodore. Carwin is generally thought to be the villain of Wieland, though he claims he never told Theodore to kill anyone, a claim supported by Theodore's repeated behavior in Clara's presence where he stands "for a minute as if listening" and acts as if he has heard commands.

Plot summary
Set sometime between the French and Indian War and the American Revolutionary War (1754–83), Wieland details the horrible events that befall Clara Wieland and her brother Theodore's family. Clara and Theodore's father was a German immigrant who founded his own religion; he came to America just before the American Revolution with the goal of evangelizing the indigenous people. When he fails at this task, he believes he has also failed his deity. One night, as he worships in his bare, secluded temple, he seems to spontaneously combust, after which his health rapidly deteriorates and he dies. His children inherit his property, which is divided equally between them. Theodore marries their childhood friend, Catharine Pleyel, and they have four children.

Clara and Theodore live in houses on adjoining property, leading lives of leisure in companionship with Catharine and her brother, Henry Pleyel. The story centers around several seemingly supernatural experiences that occur to members of the family.  The first incident involves Theodore hearing a disembodied voice that warns him of potential danger.  While the others are initially skeptical of his story, Henry and Clara have similar experiences soon afterward, which brings credibility to each of their stories.  When the mysterious Carwin appears on the scene, he suggests that the voices may be caused by human mimicry.

Clara is secretly in love with Pleyel, and makes a plan to tell him so; however, her chance is ruined. When she returns home, she finds Carwin hiding in her closet. He admits he had been planning to rape Clara, but believing her to be under the protection of a supernatural force, leaves her.

The next morning, Pleyel accuses Clara of having an affair with Carwin. He leaves quickly, without giving Clara enough time to defend herself. She decides to go to see Pleyel, to tell him he is mistaken, but he does not seem to believe her. On her way home, Clara stops to visit her friend Mrs. Baynton, where Clara finds waiting for her a letter from Carwin, asking to see her.

At Theodore's house, Clara finds that everyone seems to be asleep, so she continues on to her own home, where she is to meet with Carwin. When she arrives, there are strange noises and lights, and she sees a glimpse of Carwin's face. In her room, she finds a strange letter from Carwin, and Catharine in her bed – dead. Shocked, she sits in her room until Theodore arrives and threatens Clara. When he hears voices outside, he leaves Clara unharmed. Clara learns that Theodore's children and Louisa Conway have also been killed.

Clara falls ill; later, she is able to read the murderer's testimony. The killer is her brother, Theodore. He claims to have been acting under divine orders. Clara is sure that Carwin is the source of Theodore's madness.

Carwin reveals to Clara that he is a biloquist. He was the cause of most of the voices, but he claims that he did not tell Theodore to commit the murders. Wieland, having escaped from prison, arrives at Clara's house and tries to kill her. Carwin uses his ability to tell Theodore to stop. He says that Theodore should not have listened to the voices, and Theodore suddenly comes to his senses. He kills himself, full of remorse for what he has done.

Clara refuses to leave her house, until it burns down one day. She then goes to Europe with her uncle, and eventually marries Pleyel. Clara feels she has finally recovered from the tragic events, enough to write them down. As for Carwin, he has become a farmer in the countryside.

Apparently the novel was based on the true story of murders which took place at Tomhannock, New York (a hamlet near Pittstown) in 1781. Mirroring the incidents of the later novel, one James Yates, under the influence of a religious delusion, killed his wife and four children, then attempted to kill his sister, and expressed no remorse for his conduct in court later.

Brown gave his tragic hero a pedigree related to that of the actual German author Christoph Martin Wieland, who is mentioned obliquely in the text:

This and others of Charles Brockden Brown's novels were very influential in the later development of the Gothic genre by such writers as Edgar Allan Poe, Mary Shelley and, most especially, George Lippard. In particular, it provided an influence to Logan (1822) by John Neal, who considered Brown his literary father.

Major themes

Religious fanaticism
The obvious theme of Wieland is the criticism of religious fanaticism. The religious fanaticism of both Theodore and his father demonstrates the subjectivity of the human experience. Even more, it suggests that "godliness can corrupt, and absolute godliness can corrupt absolutely." That the horrors that befall the Wieland family come from the direct result of religious enthusiasm indicates Brown's dislike for extreme religious sentiment. Indeed, it is often suggested that Wieland is an attack on Puritanism (though it is also often thought of as a historical allegory, or even one that explores the writing process itself).

Sensationalist psychology
Wieland calls into question the sensationalist psychology of the time. The plot is based on the psychological ideology of the time, which was solely based on sensory inputs. While the action is based on this kind of psychology, Brown did not necessarily accept the doctrine without criticism. In fact, he calls into question its validity: the characters are trying to find the truth that is disguised by appearance, and the action – especially Carwin's ventriloquism – shows how difficult it is to find truth simply through sensory evidence. What Brown is concerned with is how the mind can be corrupted by unaccountable and dark impulses.

Ventriloquism
Ventriloquism exists as a plot device in Wieland, though it goes beyond this simplistic use; Clara Wieland can be thought of as Brown's ventriloquistic voice. Brown, like Carwin, speaks using Clara's voice. It has been suggested that Carwin's confession of his ventriloquism can be equated with Brown's attempt to speak with Clara's voice. When Carwin says, "I exerted all my powers to imitate your voice, your general sentiments, and your language" (Wieland, 240), it can be read that Brown himself has been attempting as an author to speak using a female voice. Seeing ventriloquism as a metaphor in Wieland reaches a deeper truth: that things may not be as they appear, and genuine truth must be actively searched for.

Limits of knowledge 
Events in the novel force the characters to confront the limits of rationality and empirical observation. The main characters' desire to understand the world around them is clear from early on in the novel, shown by frequent discussions in which Clara, Theodore, Catharine, and Henry dissect their everyday experiences. For example, Clara reports that when the group is introduced to Carwin, every "gesture, or glance, or accent" of his was "diligently marked and copiously counted on by us," and "inferences deduced from it" (Wieland 85). Likewise, they discuss the disembodied voices at length and repeatedly seek rational explanations for the bizarre events.  However, these efforts at understanding are frustrated by experiences which they are unable to explain (such as their father's spontaneous combustion and their own encounters with disembodied voices) as well as by people who use deception or withhold information (primarily Carwin). In several instances, the characters are even deceived by their own senses, a decided challenge to empirical thought.

Reception
Many modern critics fault Wieland for its gimmickry, and late-eighteenth century critics scorned it as well. The use of spontaneous combustion especially has been pointed at as a contrived element. In Brown's time, critics harshly faulted Brown for using ventriloquism as the device that drove the plot of the novel. Critics today have also disdained the ventriloquism in Wieland. In Brown's time, critics considered the work to be unsophisticated because of its dependence on the conventions of Gothic novels and novels of seduction. Regardless of its weaknesses, however, Wieland is thought to be one of the first significant novels published by an American, and it is most certainly Brown's most successful work. Joyce Carol Oates describes Wieland as "a nightmare expression of the fulfillment of repressed desire, anticipating Edgar Allan Poe's similarly claustrophobic tales of the grotesque."

See also
Memoirs of Carwin the Biloquist

References

External links

 

1798 novels
American gothic novels
18th-century American novels
Novels set in Pennsylvania
Novels by Charles Brockden Brown